Lucas Ezequiel Cuevas (born 9 November 1996) is an Argentine professional footballer who plays as a midfielder for Super League Greece 2 club Thesprotos.

Career
Cuevas was promoted into Huracán's first-team squad midway through the 2016–17 Argentine Primera División season. He was an unused substitute against Defensa y Justicia and Patronato, prior to making his professional debut after playing the final twelve minutes in an away draw versus Estudiantes on 23 April 2017. July 2018 saw Cuevas join Villa Dálmine of Primera B Nacional.

After a spell at Deportivo Madryn in 2021

Career statistics
.

References

External links

1996 births
Living people
Footballers from Buenos Aires
Argentine footballers
Association football midfielders
Argentine Primera División players
Primera Nacional players
Club Atlético Huracán footballers
Villa Dálmine footballers
Deportivo Madryn players
All Boys footballers